Anders Almgren (born 27 December 1968) is a retired Swedish footballer. Almgren made 70 Allsvenskan appearances for Djurgården and scored 0 goals.

References

Swedish footballers
Djurgårdens IF Fotboll players
Association footballers not categorized by position
1968 births
Living people